The 2010–11 NBL season is the 4th season for the Gold Coast Blaze in the NBL.

Regular season

Standings

Game log

|- style="background-color:#bbffbb;"
| 1
| 26 August
| University of Hartford
| W 97-50
|  
| 
| 
| Carrara Indoor Stadium
| 1–0
|- style="background-color:#bbffbb;"
| 2
| 5 September
| Anyang KT&G Kites
| W 98-81
|  
| 
| 
| Logan Sports Centre
| 2–0
|- style="background-color:#ffcccc;"
| 3
| 18 September
| Cairns
| L 58-92
|  
| 
| 
| Carrara Indoor Stadium
| 2-1
|- style="background-color:#ffcccc;"
| 4
| 4 October
| New Zealand
| L 53-67
|  
| 
| 
| Carrara Indoor Stadium
| 2-2

|- style="background-color:#ffcccc;"
| 1
| 15 October
| @ Wollongong
| L 83-77
| 
|
|
| WIN Entertainment Centre  3,302
| 0-1
|- style="background-color:#bbffbb;"
| 2
| 24 October
| Townsville
| W 94-90
| 
|
|
| Gold Coast Convention Centre (GCCC)  3,429
| 1-1
|- style="background-color:#bbffbb;"
| 3
| 29 October
| Cairns
| W 92-81
| 
|
|
| GCCC  2,946
| 2-1

|- style="background-color:#ffcccc;"
| 4
| 6 November
| New Zealand
| L 81-96
| 
|
|
| Gold Coast Convention Centre (GCCC)  3,871
| 2-2
|- style="background-color:#ffcccc;"
| 5
| 13 November
| @ Cairns
| L 76-96
| 
|
|
| Cairns Convention Centre  4,007
| 2-3
|- style="background-color:#ffcccc;"
| 6
| 21 November
| Melbourne
| L 82-85
| 
|
|
| GCCC  3,164
| 2-4
|- style="background-color:#ffcccc;"
| 7
| 25 November
| @ New Zealand
| L 79-100
| 
|
|
| North Shore Events Centre  TBA
| 2-5

|- style="background-color:#bbffbb;"
| 8
| 3 December
| Sydney
| W 85-68
| 
|
|
| Gold Coast Convention Centre (GCCC)  TBA
| 3-5
|- style="background-color:#ffcccc;"
| 9
| 4 December
| @ Melbourne
| L 78-82
| 
|
|
| State Netball and Hockey Centre  TBA 
| 3-6
|- style="background-color:#"
| 10
| 11 December
| @ Townsville
| 
|  
| 
| 
| Townsville Entertainment Centre  
| 
|- style="background-color:#"
| 11
| 23 December
| @ Wollongong
| 
|  
| 
| 
| WIN Entertainment Centre
| 
|- style="background-color:#"
| 12
| 31 December
| Perth
| 
|  
| 
| 
| GCCC 
| 
|-

Finals

Player statistics

Regular season

Finals

Awards

Player of the Week

Player of the Month

Coach of the Month

See also
2010–11 NBL season

References

External links

Gold Coast Blaze seasons
Gold Coast